Fred Richard Shapiro is an American academic and writer working as the editor of The Yale Book of Quotations, The Oxford Dictionary of American Legal Quotations, and several other books.

Education 
Shapiro earned a Bachelor of Science degree from the Massachusetts Institute of Technology, a Master of Library Science from the Catholic University of America, and a Juris Doctor from Harvard Law School.

Career 
Shapiro has published numerous articles on language, law, and information science, including "The Politically Correct United States Supreme Court and the Motherfucking Texas Court of Appeals: Using Legal Databases to Trace the Origins of Words and Quotations" and "Who Wrote the Serenity Prayer". He is an associate librarian and lecturer in legal research at Yale Law School. His work in identifying sources of recent sayings is seen in The Dictionary of Modern Proverbs.

References

External links
 Meet the Editor of The Yale Book of Quotations
 Profile, Yale Alumni Magazine, Sept./Oct. 2006

Living people
American writers
American editors
Massachusetts Institute of Technology alumni
Catholic University of America alumni
Harvard Law School alumni
American legal scholars
1954 births